Dive Club is an Australian teen drama television show, which premiered on 10 Shake from 29 May 2021 as a movie-length special. The series was distributed worldwide on Netflix on 3 September 2021. It follows a feisty group of teen divers who race to find their best friend when she disappears after a storm hits their small coastal town.

Production
The 12 part series is produced by The Steve Jaggi Company with international sales handled by Nicely Entertainment. Showrunner Steve Jaggi produced the series with Spencer McLaren and executive producers Jack Christian and Vanessa Shapiro. The directors include Hayley McFarlane, Rhiannon Bannenberg and Christine Luby. The series was filmed in Port Douglas, Queensland.

Cast
 Miah Madden as Maddie
 Georgia-May Davis as Lauren Rose
 Aubri Ibrag as Anna
 Sana'a Shaik as Stevie
 Mercy Cornwall as Izzie
 Joshua Heuston as Henry
 Alexander Grant as Hayden
 Joseph Spanti as Brad
 Phoenix Mendoza as Camille
 Jai Koutre as Chief Jack Rose
 Veronica Neave as Mayor Renee Volkov
 John McNeill as Sea Dog
 Kate Peters as Victoria Volkov
 Tim Ross as John Martin
 Yasmin Kassim as Lucinda

Episodes

References

External links

2021 Australian television series debuts
2021 Australian television series endings
2020s Australian drama television series
2020s teen drama television series
Australian fantasy television series
English-language Netflix original programming
10 Shake original programming
Television series about teenagers
Television series about vacationing
Television shows filmed in Australia